Nesogordonia is a genus of flowering plants. It ranges across tropical Africa, Madagascar, and the Comoro Islands. The majority of species are endemic to Madagascar.

Traditionally included in the family Sterculiaceae, it is included in the expanded Malvaceae in the APG and most subsequent systematics. In that clade, it belongs to the subfamily Dombeyoideae. Nesogordonia is among the oldest living genera of its subfamily, if not the most ancestral one.

There are 22 accepted species:
 Nesogordonia abrahamii L.C.Barnett Madagascar
 Nesogordonia ambalabeensis Arènes Madagascar
 Nesogordonia bernieri Baill. Madagascar
 Nesogordonia chrysocarpa Rakotoar. & Callm. Madagascar
 Nesogordonia crassipes (Baill.) Capuron ex Arènes Madagascar
 Nesogordonia fertilis H.Perrier Madagascar
 Nesogordonia holtzii (Engl.) Capuron ex L.C.Barnett & Dorr southeastern Kenya, Tanzania, Mozambique
 Nesogordonia humbertii Capuron Madagascar
 Nesogordonia kabingaensis (K.Schum.) Capuron ex R.Germ. Sierra Leone, Benin and Nigeria, Gabon to Uganda.
 Nesogordonia macrophylla Arénes Madagascar
 Nesogordonia micrantha Arènes Madagascar
 Nesogordonia monantha Arènes Madagascar
 Nesogordonia normandii Capuron Madagascar
 Nesogordonia pachyneura Capuron ex L.C.Barnett Madagascar
 Nesogordonia papaverifera (A.Chev.) Capuron ex N.Hallé Sierra Leone to Central African Republic and Republic of the Congo
 Nesogordonia perpulchra N.Hallé Gabon
 Nesogordonia perrieri Arènes Madagascar
 Nesogordonia rakotovaoi Rakotoar., Andriamb. & Callm. Madagascar
 Nesogordonia stylosa H.Perrier Madagascar
 Nesogordonia suzannae Labat, Munzinger & O.Pascal Mayotte
 Nesogordonia thouarsii (Baill.) Capuron ex Arènes Madagascar
 Nesogordonia tricarpellata Skema & Dorr Madagascar

Footnotes

References
  (2006): Does minimizing homoplasy really maximize homology? MaHo: A method for evaluating homology among most parsimonious trees. C. R. Palevol 7(1): 17–26.  (HTML abstract)
  (2007): Synonymy of Malvaceae. Retrieved 2008-JUN-25.

 
Malvaceae genera
Taxonomy articles created by Polbot
Taxa named by Henri Ernest Baillon
Afrotropical realm flora